Benoît (Bénédict) Fould (21 November 1792 – 28 July 1858) was a French banker and scion of the Fould family.

Fould was married to Helena Oppenheim, daughter of Salomon Oppenheim, founder of Sal. Oppenheim private bank. The bride's dowry made part of the initial capital of the new bank, Fould-Oppenheim et Cie. Ferdinand de Lesseps would name Fould as a founder of the Suez Canal Company.

References

1792 births
1858 deaths
French bankers
18th-century French Jews
Burials at Père Lachaise Cemetery
Fould family